The Maldives Labour and Social Democratic Party is a Maldivian political party founded in 2019.

An application to form the party was filled in August 2018 and the Electoral Commission granted approval in October 2018. The party was registered on 21 January 2019. On 1 July 2022, the Election Commissioner dissolved the party for failing to reached the threshold of 3,000 members required for registration of political parties in Maldives.

References

External links 
 Maldives Labour and Social Democratic Party on Twitter

Political parties in the Maldives
Political parties established in 2018
Social democratic parties